Zhou Jiangyong (born September 1967) is a former Chinese politician and member of the Chinese Communist Party (CCP). He was investigated by China's top anti-graft agency in August 2021. Previously he served as CCP secretary of Hangzhou. He is the first ministerial-level official caught in Zhejiang since the 19th CCP National Congress in 2017.

Biography
Zhou was born in Ningbo, Zhejiang, in September 1967. After graduating from Yuyao Normal School in 1985, he became a teacher at Jiangshan School.

He began his political career in December 1988, when he was appointed a member of the standing committee of the Yin County Committee of the Communist Youth League of China. In January 2001, he became vice magistrate of Yin County. In September 2002, he was named magistrate of Xiangshan County,  concurrently holding the deputy party secretary position. In March 2013 he was promoted to become mayor of Zhoushan, a position he held until December 2015. He was party secretary of Zhoushan in August 2015, and held that office until February 2017. In February 2017, he was appointed party secretary of Wenzhou, he remained in that position until May 2018, when he was transferred to Hangzhou and appointed party secretary.

Downfall
On 21 August 2021, he was put under investigation for alleged "serious violations of discipline and laws" by the Central Commission for Discipline Inspection (CCDI), the CCP's internal disciplinary body, and the National Supervisory Commission, the highest anti-corruption agency of China. His subordinate, handed himself in to the anti-corruption agency of China on August 19.

After he stepped down, the local anti-corruption agency announced the rectification of "outstanding problems in family relations, government relations and business relations", covering all in-service and retired and resigned municipal management leading cadres in recent three years.

On 27 January 2022, Zhou was formally expelled from the party.

Family
His wife is deputy secretary and chief supervisor of Ningbo Rural Commercial Bank. Internal staff revealed: "(she) is hanging a post there. She seldom comes at ordinary times and makes tens of millions of yuan a year. This has led to the indignation of the internal staff of the bank. They have been reporting jointly for a long time. In mid October last year, the Fourth Inspection Team of the Central Committee stationed in Zhejiang, and they reported again in their real name. "

His younger brother Zhou Jianyong is an associate professor of the School of Management of Shanghai University of Technology and businessman. He is a shareholder of four companies including Ningbo Yongrun Industry and Trade Technology Co., Ltd. and is involved in the fields of petrochemical industry, subway payment and big data.

Zhou Wenyong, a relative of Zhou Jiangyong, is also a businessman. He was arrested in Shandong. He participated in and controlled 13 companies, covering electromechanical, energy, petrochemical, automobile sales, investment, guarantee, management consulting and many other fields, mainly concentrated in Yinzhou District and Haishu District. Zhou Jiangyong's elder sister is also a businesswoman, and was also arrested.

References

Living people
1967 births
Chinese Communist Party politicians from Zhejiang
People's Republic of China politicians from Zhejiang
Expelled members of the Chinese Communist Party
Chinese politicians convicted of corruption
Political office-holders in Zhejiang
Politicians from Ningbo